Bruno Dettori (22 December 1941 – 2 August 2020) was an Italian politician.

Dettori was born in Sassari. He graduated in agricultural science and gained experience of teaching abroad for two academic years at the Faculty of Agriculture in Asmara, Eritrea and became the author of 40 publications and research on national and international journals related to geology and hydrology.

He began his political career in 1990 becoming a city councilor in Sassari under the Christian Democrats. He was elected senator at the end of the 2001 general election on 13 May 2001.  From 18 May 2006 to 7 May 2008 he  was part of the second Prodi government as Secretary for the Environment.

References

External links
Official site

Christian Democracy (Italy) politicians
Segni Pact politicians
Democracy is Freedom – The Daisy politicians
Democratic Party (Italy) politicians
1941 births
2020 deaths
People from Sassari